The Archdeacon of Gloucester is a senior ecclesiastical officer in the Diocese of Gloucester, England whose responsibilities include the care of clergy and church buildings within the area of the Archdeaconry of Gloucester.

History
The first recorded archdeacons of the Diocese of Worcester occur from  – the same sort of time that archdeacons occur across the church in England. Two archdeacons are recorded simultaneously from that time, but no clear territorial title occurs until 1143, when Gervase is called Archdeacon of Gloucester.

The archdeaconry was within Worcester diocese for almost 500 years, until it was formed into the newly created Diocese of Gloucester on 13 September 1541, as part of the Henrician reformation. The new diocese was briefly dissolved and returned to Worcester
again on 20 May 1552 until Worcester and Gloucester were re-divided again at by Queen Mary in 1554. From 5 October 1836, when the diocese was merged with Bristol and 9 July 1897, when Bristol became an independent diocese again, the archdeaconry was in the Diocese of Gloucester and Bristol. Parts of Gloucester archdeaconry were used to create the Cirencester archdeaconry (since renamed Cheltenham) on 8 December 1882.

The archdeaconry consists of the deaneries of Forest, Gloucester City, Severn Vale, Stroud, & Wotton.

List of archdeacons

High Medieval
Junior archdeacon of the diocese:
bef. 1112–bef. 1114: Hugh (probably became senior archdeacon)
bef. 1114–aft. 1115: Richard (possibly same man as Richard I)
bef. 1122–aft. 1140: Thurstan
bef. 1134–aft. 1134: Richard (I; possibly same man as above Richard; probably vice-archdeacon)
Archdeacons of Gloucester:
bef. 1143–aft. 1151: Gervase
bef. 1148–bef. 1157: Richard (I; again; probably vice-archdeacon)
bef. 1160–bef. 1178 (d.): Matthew
bef. 1178–1186 (res.): William of Northall
bef. 1187–aft. 1190: Robert de Inglesham (also Archdeacon of Surrey, bef. 1159–aft. 1178)
bef. 1191–1200 (d.): Richard (II)
1200–September 1200 (res.): John de Gray (Archdeacon of Cleveland at same or similar time)
bef. 1201–7 May 1210 (d.): William de Verdun
bef. 1211–27 May 1245 (deprived): Maurice de Arundel
bef. 1245–bef. 1248 (res.): William Lupus/Le Loup
1248–bef. 1254 (d.): Thomas
bef. 1256–aft. 1270: Hugh de Cantilupe, 2nd son of William II de Cantilupe (d.1251), 2nd feudal baron of Eaton Bray in Bedfordshire, and elder brother of Saint Thomas de Cantilupe (c. 1218–1282), Bishop of Hereford;
aft. 1274–6 March 1288 (d.): Robert de Fangfoss
11 September 1288–bef. 1295: John Devereux/de Ebroicis
23 July 1295–bef. 1308 (d.): Walter de Burdon

Late Medieval
6 June 1309 – 1317 (d.): William de Birstone
16 November 1317–bef. 1318 (res.): Nicholas de Hungate
3 June 1318 – 21 May 1328 (exch.): Hugh de Statherne
21 May 1328–bef. 1331 (res.): Joceus de Kinebauton
25 May–21 June 1331 (res.): John de Uske
21 June 1331 – 7 April 1348 (res.): Roger de Breynton
7 April 1348 – 15 March 1355 (exch.): Richard de Ledbury
15 March 1355 – 1368 (d.): Thomas de Stratford
bef. 1139–5 September 1369 (exch.): Roger Peres
5 September 1369 – 1380 (res.): William de Thirsford
15 December 1380 – 3 March 1395 (exch.): Nicholas Geyell
3 March 1395–bef. 1404 (d.): Richard Winchcombe
5 November 1406–April 1428 (d.): Nicholas Herbury
21 April 1428–bef. 1462 (d.): Philip Polton
8 March–August 1462 (res.): John Kingscote
bef. 1463–bef. 1482 (d.): John Segden
18 June 1482–aft. 1487: Robert Morton (also Bishop of Worcester from 1486)
26 December 1487–bef. 1489 (d.): John Dunmoe
12 February 1489 – 1497 (res.): Giovanni de' Gigli (John de Gigliis)

9 February 1498 – 1503 (res.): Geoffrey Blythe
7 December 1503 – 1509 (res.): Thomas Ruthall
bef. 1512–aft. 1517: Peter Carmelian
bef. 1529–aft. 1539 (res.): John Bell
10 February 1540–aft. 1544: Nicholas Wotton (also Dean of York from 1544)

Early modern
From 13 September 1541, the archdeaconry was part of the Diocese of Gloucester.
From 20 May 1552 until 1554, the archdeaconry was temporarily returned to Worcester diocese.
1552–August 1559 (d.): John Williams
9 October 1559 – 29 January 1575 (res.): Guy Etton
1 February 1575–bef. 1602 (d.): George Savage
1 September 1602–bef. 1606 (d.): Robert Hill
28 February 1607 – 14 June 1634 (d.): Samuel Burton
25 June 1634–bef. 1660 (d.): Hugh Robinson
7 August 1660–?: John Middleton
?–26 December 1671 (d.): Edward Pope
1671 - 1673 Thomas Vyner
1673–10 December 1678 (d.): John Gregory
13 December 1678–bef. 1703 (d.): Thomas Hyde
10 March 1703–bef. 1714 (d.): Robert Parsons
29 July 1714 – 29 October 1737 (d.): Nathaniel Lye
11 February 1738 – 22 July 1767 (d.): William Geekie
27 August 1767 – 1774 (res.): Richard Hurd
23 December 1774 – 3 June 1804 (d.): James Webster
23 July 1804–bef. 1814 (res.): Timothy Stonhouse Vigor
31 March 1814 – 3 March 1825 (d.): Thomas Rudge
14 May 1825 – 8 December 1864 (d.): John Timbrill
When Bristol was merged into the diocese on 5 October 1836, the diocese was renamed to Gloucester and Bristol.

Late modern
1865–1881 (ret.): George Prévost
1881–1902 (ret.): John Sheringham
With the re-erection of Bristol diocese on 9 July 1897, Gloucester archdeaconry was once again in the Diocese of Gloucester.
1902–1903 (res.): John Bowers
1903–8 February 1917 (d.): Edward Scobell
1917–1919 (res.): Walter Hobhouse
1919–1933 (res.): Charles Ridsdale
1933–1948 (res.): Austin Hodson (also Bishop suffragan of Tewkesbury from 1938)
1949–12 February 1982 (d.): Walter Wardle
1982–2000 (ret.): Christopher Wagstaff (afterwards archdeacon emeritus)
2000–31 May 2012 (ret.): Geoffrey Sidaway
12 September 201227 September 2018 (res.): Jackie Searle (became Bishop of Crediton)
27 January 2019 – present: Hilary Dawson

References

Sources
 
 
 
 
 Gloucestershire County Council archive – Diocese of Gloucester, 1541–2009 – Bishop and Archdeacons

Lists of Anglicans